John Pike may refer to:

 John Pike, founder and director of the think tank GlobalSecurity.org
 John Pike, police officer who instigated the UC Davis pepper spray incident
 St John Pike (1909–1992), Anglican bishop
 John Pike (b. 7 January 1945), British actor known for Ivanhoe (1958), Kidnapped (1959) and Live It Up! (1963)
 John Pike (footballer) (1891–1968), Australian rules footballer
 John Pike (settler) (1613), founder of Woodbridge Township, New Jersey
 John Pike (sport shooter) (1861–1919), British sport shooter
 John Pike, architect of the Carib Theatre in Kingston, Jamaica

See also
 John Pyke (born 1940), Australian physicist and a former university law lecturer
 John George Pyke (1744–1828), English-born merchant and political figure in Nova Scotia